Gokulpur is a village in the Khandar tehsil of the Sawai Madhopur in Rajasthan, India.  It is 60 km from district headquarters. As of 2013 it had a population of 375.

The nearest post office is Khandar. Its Pin code is.322025

The main occupation for the people of Gokulpur is agriculture.

Characteristically, each of the Indian villages recognizes a particular deity as the protector of the concerned village and the people of that village get together to worship the deity. Religion, which is deeply instilled in the village life in India, further supports the villagers to consider this as an essential part of village prosperity. The uninterrupted village life in India entertain themselves amidst the colour of the festivals like Diwali, Holi, Dussehra, etc., in the captivating pulse of dance and songs and of course in the emotion of rural theatres as whole also done in the Gokulpur.

The nearest river is Banas River.

References 

Villages in Sawai Madhopur district